John Nevin Schaeffer (July 23, 1882 – June 10, 1942) was an American classicist from Danville, Pennsylvania who spent his career teaching at Franklin & Marshall College, from which he also received his bachelor's degree in 1903. He would later receive a second degree from Oriel College at the University of Oxford, where he was a Rhodes Scholar. With Henry Lamar Crosby, whom he met while teaching summer courses at the University of Pennsylvania, he authored Introduction to Greek, a popular textbook on ancient Greek which remained in print for 20 years following its publication.

Schaeffer served on the Lancaster, Pennsylvania school board. He married Ruth Frantz and they had five children. His son, Philip B. Schaeffer, was city editor at The Philadelphia Inquirer.

References

1882 births
1942 deaths
American philologists
Franklin & Marshall College alumni
Alumni of Oriel College, Oxford
American Rhodes Scholars
People from Danville, Pennsylvania
People from Lancaster, Pennsylvania
Franklin & Marshall College faculty
Academics from Pennsylvania
20th-century philologists